Boulenger's  short-legged skink (Brachymeles boulengeri) is a species of lizard in the family Scincidae. The species is endemic to the Philippines.

Etymology
The specific name, boulengeri, is in honor of Belgian-born British herpetologist George Albert Boulenger.

Geographic range
In the Philippines, B. boulengeri is found in Bohol, Luzon, Mindoro, Panay, Polillo, and Visayas.

Habitat

Description
Dorsally, it is brown; ventrally, it is yellow-brown. All four legs are small, each with five toes.

Behavior
B. boulengeri is terrestrial and fossorial, living in leaf litter and under rotten logs.

Reproduction
B. boulengeri is viviparous.

References

Further reading
Brown WC, Rabor DS (1967). "Review of the Genus Brachymeles (Sauria), with Descriptions of New Species and Subspecies". Proceedings of the California Academy of Sciences, Fourth Series 34: 525–548. (Brachymeles gracilis boulengeri, new combination, pp. 537–540).
Taylor EH (1922). The Lizards of the Philippine Islands. Manila: Government of the Philippine Islands, Department of Agriculture and Natural Resources, Bureau of Science. Publication No. 17. 269 pp. + Plates 1–22. (Brachymeles boulengeri, new species, pp. 246–247, Figure 46 + Plate 22, figure 2).).

Reptiles of the Philippines
Reptiles described in 1922
Brachymeles
Taxa named by Edward Harrison Taylor